Gillette Children's is a non-profit hospital located in St. Paul, Minnesota, USA. Through its hospital, clinics and greater Minnesota locations, Gillette treats patients with brain, bone and movement conditions needing specialized expertise.

History
Gillette Children's focuses on pediatric medical treatment and research. It was founded by Arthur Gillette and Jessie Haskins in 1897. It took on Arthur Gillette's name as the hospital's first chief surgeon, an appointment given by the regents of the University of Minnesota.
Originally, it was situated in a ward inside City and County Hospital of St. Paul, but in 1911 it outgrew that limited space and moved into its own facilities in Phalen Park. In 1977, it moved again, this time to space in Regions Hospital in St. Paul, Minnesota. Currently, it operates a system of clinics around the state of Minnesota, including Twin Cities locations in Burnsville, Maple Grove, and St. Paul; and greater Minnesota sites in Alexandria, Baxter, Bemidji, Brainerd, Duluth, Mankato, St. Cloud and Willmar.

Services
Gillette Children's treats patients who have some of the rarest and most complex conditions in pediatric medicine, including cerebral palsy, scoliosis, plagiocephaly, brain and spinal cord injury, epilepsy and seizures, torticollis, hydrocephalus, craniosynostosis, spina bifida, muscular dystrophy, cleft lip and palate, limb-length discrepancy, spinal muscular atrophy and osteogenesis imperfecta. 
Gillette provides inpatient and outpatient rehabilitation therapy to help patients mitigate the effects of disabilities and to return function following serious injury or complex surgery.

Gillette uses advanced technology to diagnose and treat these conditions. It operates the James R. Gage Center for Gait and Motion Analysis, one of the nation's busiest clinical motion analysis centers. Since 1985, the James R. Gage Center for Gait and Motion Analysis has used motion capture technology to diagnose and plan treatments for children who have complex conditions affecting their musculoskeletal and neurological systems. Physicians use gait and motion analysis data to determine the best way to maintain or improve children's mobility.

Gillette Children's is a specialty medical center, meaning that it treats only patients who are considered "outliers" in the medical community. Gillette doesn't treat common childhood illnesses or cancer. Children who have disabilities often need a more advanced level of medical care than the average pediatric patient.

Gillette operates using an integrated care model. To help make it easier for families to coordinate multiple appointments, Gillette organizes care around the child's condition. Experts from all of the areas a child needs work together in highly coordinated teams. This integrated model of care provides better outcomes for patients and helps lower the overall cost of care. Patients and families often can see all of their providers on the same day, which results in less stress and a better patient experience. But, this model of care is also highly efficient. By working together at every point of a child's care, providers eliminate the potential for duplicating tests and procedures, save staff time by consulting with one another immediately, and create care plans more quickly than they otherwise could.

References

 

Hospital buildings completed in 1911
Children's hospitals in the United States
Hospitals in Minnesota
1897 establishments in Minnesota
Hospitals established in 1897